Albert J. Jackson Jr. (November 27, 1935 – October 1, 1975) was an American drummer, producer, and songwriter. He was a founding member of Booker T. & the M.G.'s, a group of session musicians who worked for Stax Records and produced their own instrumentals. Jackson was affectionately dubbed "The Human Timekeeper" for his drumming ability. He was inducted into the Memphis Music Hall of Fame in 2015, and the Rock and Roll Hall of Fame as a member of Booker T. & the M.G.'s in 1992.

Early life
Jackson's father, Al Jackson Sr., led a jazz/swing dance band in Memphis, Tennessee. The young Jackson started drumming at an early age and began playing on stage with his father's band in 1940, at the age of five. He later played in producer and trumpeter Willie Mitchell's band and at the same time was holding down a chair in the popular Ben Branch Band.

In an interview with Drum! magazine, Mitchell recalled,
Al Junior was about 14 years old then. I said to his father, 'Hey, let’s use your son!' He said, 'Oh, man, he can’t play this stuff!' But he did make the gig. He set up his kit – a cymbal, a snare drum, and a bass drum – and I kicked the thing off. And, man, that thing went off at 20 tempos!
But that was around 7:00 o'clock. And by the time Al Senior came in an hour later, at 8:00 o'clock, Al Jackson Jr. was swinging that damn band like a pro.

Future bandmates Steve Cropper and Donald "Duck" Dunn first heard Jackson playing in Mitchell's band at the Flamingo Room, and the all-white Manhattan Club. Mitchell had also hired Booker T. Jones for his band. It was Jones who suggested Jackson be brought to Stax. He said, "You guys need to know about Al." Dunn said that Jackson almost caused his wife to divorce him, because after finishing his own gig at one o'clock, he would stop by a club to hear Jackson and would get home at four or five in the morning; "He was that good!" said Dunn. At first, Jackson was reluctant to join Stax. He felt he could make more money playing live than doing session work. He wanted a guaranteed regular salary to come over to Stax (although he continued to play on sessions produced by Mitchell for Hi Records). And so he became the first Stax session musician to be on a weekly salary.

Career
At Stax, Jackson formed the M.G.'s with Booker T. Jones, Steve Cropper and Lewie Steinberg (later to be replaced by Duck Dunn). During his tenure at Stax, he became one of the most influential drummers in the history of recorded music, providing an instantly recognizable backbeat behind the label's artists, including Rufus Thomas, Carla Thomas, Eddie Floyd, Sam & Dave, Otis Redding and blues guitarist Albert King (whose work Jackson also produced). In the 1970s, he co-wrote and played on several hits by Al Green, including "Let's Stay Together" and "I'm Still in Love with You", at Hi, and he was also a session drummer for many artists, such as Elvis Presley, Bill Withers, Wilson Pickett, Leon Russell, Jerry Lee Lewis, Eric Clapton, Jean Knight, Aretha Franklin, Major Lance, Ann Peebles, Rod Stewart, Shirley Brown, Donny Hathaway and Herbie Mann.

In 1975, four years after the release of their last album, Melting Pot, the members of Booker T. & the M.G.'s decided to wrap up their individual projects and devote three years to a reunion of the band. A few months later, Jackson was murdered in his home.

Death
On September 30, 1975, Jackson was scheduled to fly from Memphis to Detroit, to produce a Major Lance session, when he supposedly heard a reminder on the radio about the Joe Frazier–Muhammad Ali fight that night. Jackson called Detroit to delay the session, saying he was going to watch the "Thrilla in Manila" on the big screen at the Mid-South Coliseum.

Though still legally married, Jackson was estranged from his wife, Barbara Jackson. In July 1975, his wife had shot him in the chest, but he decided to not press charges.  He was in the process of filing for a divorce and intending to move to Atlanta, so that he could begin working with Stax singer and songwriter William Bell.

Jackson attended the screening with Eddie Floyd and Terry Manning. After the screening, he returned home to find intruders in the house. Reportedly, he was told to get down on his knees, and was fatally shot five times in the back. Around 3 A.M. on October 1, Barbara Jackson ran out in the street, yelling for help. She told police that burglars had tied her up and shot her husband when he had returned home. Police found nothing out of place in the house, and Jackson's wallet and jewelry were still on him.

The man believed to have pulled the trigger had reportedly known someone in Memphis. After robbing a bank in Florida, that person told the alleged triggerman to meet him at Al Jackson's house. Tracked through Florida, to Memphis, and to Seattle, Washington, the suspected murderer, the boyfriend of Barbara Jackson's friend Denise LaSalle, was killed by a police officer on July 15, 1976, after an unrelated gun battle.

Equipment
For recording Jackson typically used various combinations of Ludwig and Rogers drums and Zildjian cymbals. Two studio kits played by Jackson are on display in museums; a Ludwig kit (with a Rogers Powertone snare drum) from Stax Records in the Musicians Hall of Fame & Museum, and a Rogers kit (with a Ludwig Acrolite snare drum) from Hi Records in the Stax Museum.

According to Steve Cropper, as quoted in Give the Drummer Some! by Jim Payne, a grey pearl Rogers floor tom was used in the mix 'n' match kit at Stax.

Collaborations 
With Booker T. & the M.G.'s
 Green Onions (Stax Records, 1962)
 Soul Dressing (Stax Records, 1965)
 And Now! (Stax Records, 1966)
 In the Christmas Spirit (Stax Records, 1966)
 Hip Hug-Her (Stax Records, 1967)
 Doin' Our Thing (Stax Records, 1968)
 Soul Limbo (Stax Records, 1968)
 UpTight (Stax Records, 1969)
 The Booker T. Set (Stax Records, 1969)
 McLemore Avenue (Stax Records, 1970)
 Melting Pot (Stax Records, 1971)

With Otis Redding
 Pain in My Heart (Atco Records, 1964)
 The Great Otis Redding Sings Soul Ballads (Volt Records, 1965)
 Otis Blue: Otis Redding Sings Soul (Volt Records, 1965)
 The Soul Album (Volt Records, 1966)
 Complete & Unbelievable: The Otis Redding Dictionary of Soul (Volt Records, 1966)
 King & Queen (Volt Records, 1967)
 The Dock of the Bay (Volt Records, 1968)

With Donny Hathaway
 Donny Hathaway (Atco Records, 1971)

With Al Green
 Let's Stay Together (Hi Records, 1972)
 I'm Still in Love with You (Hi Records, 1972)
 Call Me (Hi Records, 1973)
 Livin' for You (Hi Records, 1973)

With Shirley Brown
 Woman to Woman (Truth Records, 1974)

With David Porter
 Victim of the Joke? An Opera (Enterprise Records, 1971)

With Rod Stewart
 Atlantic Crossing (Warner Bros. Records, 1975)
 A Night on the Town (Warner Bros. Records, 1976)

With Bill Withers
 Just as I Am (Sussex Records, 1971)

With Delaney & Bonnie
 Home (Stax Records, 1969)

With William Bell
 The Soul of a Bell (Stax Records, 1967)
 Bound to Happen (Stax Records, 1969)
 Relating (Stax Records, 1974)

With Alan Gerber
 The Alan Gerber Album (Shelter Records, 1971)

With Mavis Staples
 Mavis Staples (Volt Records, 1969)
 Only for the Lonely (Volt Records, 1970)

With Aretha Franklin
 Young, Gifted and Black (Atlantic Records, 1972)

With Albert King
 Born Under a Bad Sign (Stax Records, 1967)
 Years Gone By (Stax Records, 1969)
 The Blues Don't Change (Stax Records, 1974)

With Eric Clapton
 461 Ocean Boulevard (RSO Records, 1974)

With Wilson Pickett
 In the Midnight Hour (Atlantic Records, 1965)
 The Exciting Wilson Pickett (Atlantic Records, 1966)

With Eddie Floyd
 Knock on Wood (Stax Records, 1967)

With Elvis Presley
 Raised on Rock / For Ol' Times Sake (RCA Records, 1973)

With Carla Thomas
 Memphis Queen (Stax Records, 1969)
 Love Means... (Stax Records, 1971)

With Leon Russell
 Will O' the Wisp (Shelter Records, 1975)

References

Cited sources

External links
Al Jackson Jr. page – funkydrummer.com

Soulsville USA: The Story of Stax Records by Rob Bowman
Al Jackson Jr. tribute page – DrummerCafe.com
Al Jackson Jr. page – Drummerworld.com

1935 births
1975 deaths
1975 murders in the United States
American session musicians
Musicians from Memphis, Tennessee
People murdered in Tennessee
Deaths by firearm in Tennessee
Murdered African-American people
Male murder victims
American murder victims
Booker T. & the M.G.'s members
African-American drummers
American funk drummers
Rhythm and blues drummers
Soul drummers
Bongo players
Conga players
Triangle players
Maracas players
Tambourine players
Güiro players
20th-century American drummers
American male drummers
American blues drummers
20th-century American male musicians